Kirgizovo (Qırğıź) is a rural locality (a village) in Novokainlykovsky Selsoviet, Krasnokamsky District, Bashkortostan, Russia. The population was 124 as of 2010. There is 1 street.

Geography 
Kirgizovo is located 67 km south of Nikolo-Beryozovka (the district's administrative centre) by road. Burnyush is the nearest rural locality.

References 

Rural localities in Krasnokamsky District